Nathi Lions was a South African football club based in KwaMashu, roughly 30 km north of Durban. The team franchise was renamed Atlie FC in 2011.

External links
Premier Soccer League
NFD Club Info

Association football clubs established in 1997
National First Division clubs
Soccer clubs in Durban
1997 establishments in South Africa
Defunct soccer clubs in South Africa
2011 disestablishments in South Africa
Association football clubs disestablished in 2011